Percy Sekine (born 20 February 1920 in London, died on 15 October 2010) was a distinguished sensei of the Hammersmith, London based Judokan.  He represented Great Britain in international judo tournaments four times in the 1940s and 1950s, and was never beaten. He was also a coach of the British national judo team. His wife Hana was the daughter of Gunji Koizumi.

During the Second World War he served in the RAF and was shot down over the Netherlands in the Winter of 1942. He was taken prisoner and sent to Stalag 383 in Bavaria. While there he formed a judo club and taught fellow prisoners who in turn taught others when Sekine was moved to another camp.

See also 
European Judo Championships
History of martial arts
List of judo techniques
List of judoka
Martial arts timeline

References 

1920 births
2010 deaths
British World War II prisoners of war
British male judoka
Sportspeople from London
Royal Air Force personnel of World War II
Judoka trainers